José Fernández may refer to:

Writers 
José Antonio Fernández de Castro (1887–1951), Cuban journalist and writer
José Joaquín Fernández de Lizardi (1776–1827), Mexican writer and political journalist
José Ramón Fernández (journalist) (born 1946), Mexican journalist

Sport
José Fernandez (athlete), Paralympic athlete from Spain
Jose Fernandez (basketball) (born 1971), head women's basketball coach for the University of South Florida
José Fernandez (equestrian) (born 1947), Brazilian Olympic equestrian
José Fernández (middle-distance runner) (born 1933), Spanish Olympic athlete
José Fernández (racing driver) (born 1968), Australian racing driver
José Salgado Fernández (born 1989), Mexican boxer
José Fernandez (Panamanian boxer), see Aaron Pryor
José Fernandez (boxer), see Vilomar Fernandez

Baseball 
José Fernández (catcher) (1896–1972), Cuban-born baseball catcher and team manager, Negro leagues career 1916–1950
José Fernández (pitcher) (1992–2016), Cuban-American baseball pitcher
José Fernández (pitcher, born 1993), Dominican baseball pitcher
José Fernández (third baseman) (born 1974), Dominican Republic professional baseball player in the United States, Korea, and Japan
José Miguel Fernández (born 1988), Cuban-born baseball second baseman

Footballers
José Fernández (footballer, born 1939), member of Peru's 1970 FIFA World Cup squad
José Fernández (Chilean footballer) (1928–2009), Chilean footballer
José Alberto Fernández (born 1970), Honduran footballer
José Carlos Fernández (born 1983), Peruvian footballer
José Carlos Fernández González (born 1971), Bolivian footballer
José Iglesias Fernández (1926–2007), Spanish footballer
José Ignacio "Nacho" Fernández (born 1990), Spanish international footballer
José Luis Fernández (born 1987), Argentine footballer

Politicians 
José Agustín Fernández, Paraguayan judge and human rights activist, found the "terror archives"
José Ramón Fernández (born 1923), vice-president of the Cuban Council of Ministers
José Félix Fernández Estigarribia (born 1941), Paraguayan foreign minister, ambassador, senator
José Fernández Madrid (1789–1830), Colombian statesman, physician, scientist and writer
Jose W. Fernandez, U.S. Assistant Secretary of State for Economic, Energy, and Business Affairs
José Fernández (Guatemala), Guatemalan politician and one-time head of the Progressive Party, in Guatemalan general election, 1995
José Fernández (Mexico), statesman, Secretary of Foreign Affairs for Mexico
José Luciano Fernández, acting Governor of San Juan Province

Other
José Fernández Arteaga, archbishop of the Roman Catholic Archdiocese of Chihuahua
José Antonio Fernández Carbajal (born 1954), Mexican businessman
José Ramon Fernández (1808–1883), sugar baron in Puerto Rico
Joseíto Fernández (1908–1979), Cuban singer